A Few Good Men is a play by Aaron Sorkin, first produced on Broadway by David Brown in 1989. It tells the story of military lawyers at a court-martial who uncover a high-level conspiracy in the course of defending their clients, two United States Marines accused of murder.

It opened on Broadway at the Music Box Theatre in New York on November 15, 1989, in a production directed by Don Scardino, with Tom Hulce as Lieutenant Junior Grade Daniel Kaffee, Megan Gallagher as Lieutenant commander Joanne Galloway, and Stephen Lang as Colonel Jessep. Michael O'Hare replaced Lang as Jessep later in the run.

Sorkin adapted his work into a screenplay for the 1992 film of the same name.

Plot 

Private William Santiago, a United States Marine at the Cuban naval base of Guantanamo Bay, is a weak Marine who gets along poorly with his fellow Marines and has gone outside the chain of command to request a transfer. Although Lieutenant Colonel Matthew Markinson requests that Santiago be transferred, Base Commander Colonel Nathan Jessup instructs Lieutenant Jonathan James Kendrick, Santiago's platoon commander, to "train" Santiago. Soon afterward, Santiago dies. He was murdered, and Marines Lance Corporal Harold Dawson and Private First Class Louden Downey will stand trial.

United States Navy JAG Corps investigator and lawyer Lieutenant Commander Joanne Galloway believes Dawson and Downey may have carried out a "code red" order: a brutal extrajudicial punishment. Santiago was ostensibly killed in retaliation for naming Dawson in a fenceline shooting into Cuba, but Galloway believes Santiago was killed as part of a premeditated plan. Galloway wants to represent them, but the case is assigned to fellow Navy officer and lawyer Lieutenant Junior Grade Daniel Kaffee, a bumbling attorney who enjoys accepting plea deals. Kaffee's casual attitude bothers Galloway, while Galloway annoys Kaffee with her meddling.

At Guantanamo Bay, Kaffee and Galloway interrogate Colonel Jessup and others. Jessup asserts that Santiago was supposed to be transferred the following day. Dawson and Downey reject Kaffee's offer to enter into a plea agreement with US Marine Captain Jack Ross, the prosecutor, claiming that Kendrick gave them the "code red" order and that they never intended for Santiago to die. Dawson thinks it is dishonorable for Kaffee to opt for a plea agreement rather than stand their ground in court. Kaffee wants to be terminated from his position as counsel because he believes the case is worthless. Kaffee suddenly submits a not guilty plea on behalf of the accused at the arraignment. He explains to Galloway that the reason he was selected to handle the case was because it was anticipated that he would take a plea deal and the case would then be closed. 

Markinson tells Kaffee during their covert meeting that Jessup never requested Santiago be transferred. According to the defense, Dawson was passed up for promotion because he had given food to a Marine who had been ordered to go without meals. The defense presents a favorable picture of Dawson and shows that "code reds" had previously been authorized through Downey. On the other hand, Downey claims under cross-examination that he was not present when Dawson allegedly received the "code red" instruction. Markinson kills himself before he can testify because he feels guilty about not protecting a Marine under his charge.

Kaffee thinks the case has been lost without Markinson's testimony. He complains that he fought the case rather than accepting a settlement as he returns home drunk. Galloway urges Kaffee to ask Jessup to testify despite the possibility of facing court-martial for defying a superior officer.

When Kaffee brings up a discrepancy in Jessup's testimony in court at the Washington Navy Yard—that his Marines never disobey orders and that Santiago was to be relocated for his own safety—he is disturbed. Jessup spars under Kaffee's interrogation. Considering that Jessup had told his men to leave Santiago alone, Kaffee wonders why he was still in danger. Jessup, disgusted by Kaffee's behavior, praises the military's contribution to national security as well as his own. Finally, Jessup admits with disdain that he gave the "code red" command. While attempting to leave the courthouse, Jessup is arrested.

The murder and conspiracy charges against Dawson and Downey are dropped, but they are found guilty of "conduct unbecoming" and will be dishonorably discharged. Dawson explains that they failed to stand up for people who were too helpless to defend themselves, like Santiago, while Downey is unsure what they did wrong. Kaffee tells Dawson that having honor does not require wearing a patch on one's arm. Dawson salutes Kaffee and recognizes him as an officer. Before Ross leaves to arrest Kendrick, Kaffee and Ross give each other compliments.

Characters
 United States Navy JAG Corps Lieutenant Junior Grade Daniel A. Kaffee: The main lawyer who defends both Dawson and Downey. He starts as a plea-bargain-happy lawyer and, with help from Joanne Galloway, he develops into a lawyer who is willing to fight for his clients.
 United States Marine Corps Private First Class Louden Downey: One of the two men accused of the murder of Santiago. He is the quiet member of the two soldiers and lets Lance Corporal Dawson do the talking for him.
 United States Navy JAG Corps Lieutenant Commander Joanne Galloway: A hardworking and determined lawyer who finds and brings light to the murder case.
 United States Navy JAG Corps Captain Isaac Whitaker: The commanding officer in Washington. He sends Galloway to Guantanamo Bay.
 United States Marine Corps Judge Advocate Division Lieutenant Jack Ross: The lawyer who oversees prosecuting Dawson and Downey.
 United States Marine Corps Captain Matthew A. Markinson: Worked with Jessep and suggested moving Santiago.
 United States Marine Corps Lieutenant Colonel Nathan R. Jessep: The commanding officer in Guantanamo Bay. He ordered the "Code Red" of Private Santiago.
 United States Marine Corps Lance Corporal Harold W. Dawson: One of the two men accused of the murder of Private Santiago.
 United States Marine Corps First Lieutenant Jonathan James Kendrick: Santiago's platoon commander.

Play
Sorkin got the idea for the play from a phone conversation with his sister Deborah, who had graduated from Boston University Law School and was serving a three-year stint with the Navy Judge Advocate General's Corps. She was going to Guantanamo Bay Naval Base to defend a group of Marines who had come close to killing a fellow Marine in a hazing ordered by a superior officer. Sorkin took that information and wrote much of his story on cocktail napkins during the first act of the musical La Cage aux Folles while bartending at the Palace Theatre on Broadway.

Several former Navy JAG lawyers have been proposed as the model for the character of Lieutenant Daniel Kaffee, USN, JAG Corps. These include Donald Marcari, David Iglesias, and Walter Bansley III. The court martial was Macari's first big court case. However, in a statement released by his spokeswoman, Sorkin said, "The character of Dan Kaffee in A Few Good Men is entirely fictional and was not inspired by any particular individual."

Once Sorkin completed a draft, his theatrical agent sent it to producer David Brown, who wanted the film rights. Sorkin sold Brown the rights, getting Brown to agree to also produce A Few Good Men as a play.

Premieres
A Few Good Men had its world premiere at the Heritage Repertory Theatre at the University of Virginia's Department of Drama on September 19, 1989. It then transferred to the Kennedy Center.

The original Broadway stage production opened at the Music Box Theatre in New York on November 15, 1989, in a production directed by Don Scardino, designed by Ben Edwards, and with music by John Gromada. It starred Tom Hulce as LTJG Kaffee; Megan Gallagher as LCDR JoAnne Galloway; Clark Gregg as Lt. Jack Ross; Stephen Lang as Col. Jessep, and Robert Hogan as Capt. Matthew A. Markinson. Replacement actors included Timothy Busfield and Bradley Whitford as Lt. Jack Ross (understudy for Kaffee), Perry King, Michael O'Hare, and Ron Perlman as Jessep, and Pamela Blair as Galloway. Joshua Malina also appeared. Malina went on to reprise his role in the movie adaption.

The production ran for 497 performances.

Other performances
A Spanish-language production titled Hombres de Honor opened on January 10, 1991, at the Ferré Performing Arts Center in Puerto Rico, starring Cordelia González and Rafo Muñiz, directed by Pablo Cabrera.

A national touring company performed through 1992 with Michael O'Keefe as LTJG Kaffee, Alyson Reed as LCDR Galloway, and Paul Winfield as the judge.

In January 1993 A Few Good Men had its premiere in German language at the Volkstheater, Vienna, Austria (translation: Gunther Baumann, director: Erhard Pauer, Daniel Kaffee: Alfons Haider). In the following years this production went on tour and was shown all over Germany, Switzerland and Austria (German title: Eine Frage der Ehre/A Question of Honor).

A revival of the play starring Rob Lowe in the role of LTJG Kaffee, Suranne Jones as LCDR Galloway, and John Barrowman as Capt. Ross opened at the Theatre Royal Haymarket, London, in late August 2005 for preview showings followed by a three-month run in early September 2005. The stage show was directed by David Esbjornson.

In 2006, the Hudson Shakespeare Company of New Jersey staged a production as part of their second stage for modern shows. The tour was presented in city courtrooms, directed by Jon Ciccarelli and featured notable New York City actors such as Jon Crefeld as LTJG Kaffee and Charles J. Roby as Col. Jessup.

Jensen Ackles appeared as LTJG Kaffee alongside Lou Diamond Phillips as Col. Jessep in a production of the play at the Casa Mañana Theatre, in Fort Worth, Texas, June 5–10, 2007.

It has also been performed in London, Oxford, and Portsmouth by amateur groups.

A Hungarian production of the play was performed at Madách Szinház, Budapest. It was directed by Imre Kerényi, starring Sándor Czvetkó, Éva Kerekes, and Gábor Koncz.

By the Book Theatre produced the play November 25, 2014, to December 6, 2014 at the McManus Studio Theatre, London, Ontario. The production won 4 Brickenden Awards including Outstanding Drama.

June 30, 2016, marked the opening of the Warehouse Studio Theatre production at The Noho Arts Center under the direction of Tony Pauletto and starring K. C. Clyde as Kaffee alongside Dennis LaValle as Jessup and Sarah Klein as Galloway.

In March 2016, NBC announced its intent to broadcast a live television production of A Few Good Men, starring Alec Baldwin as Col. Jessup, in the second quarter of 2018, with a teleplay adapted by Sorkin from his original script. The broadcast would be executive produced by Craig Zadan and Neil Meron, and patterned upon NBC's ongoing series of live Broadway musicals. However, NBC has yet to announce an airdate. Variety reported that the availability of Sorkin, Zadan, and Meron may have had an impact, noting that Sorkin had to represent his 2017 film Molly's Game during awards season, while Zadan and Meron (who have produced all of NBC's live musicals) were committed to other projects (such as Jesus Christ Superstar Live in Concert in 2018, and a later canceled production of Hair in 2019) being produced by NBC in lieu of Bye Bye Birdie, which had been delayed multiple times in order to accommodate Jennifer Lopez's other projects. Zadan died on August 20, 2018, at the age of 69.

Awards and nominations
The Broadway production earned Megan Gallagher a 1990 Theatre World Award and a Best Actor nomination for Tom Hulce at the 44th Tony Awards.

Source material and legacy
The play is based on events that took place at Guantanamo Bay Naval Base in July 1986, though various details were changed for dramatic purposes. Members of Rifle Security Company, Windward Side, 2nd Platoon believed that one of their number, Pfc. William Alvarado, was a malingerer and had informed about a Marine firing across the border into Cuba. In a retaliatory hazing (called a "Code Red"), ten Marines seized Alvarado, blindfolded him, stuffed a rag in his mouth, beat him, and shaved his head. Alvarado was seriously injured, but did not die. Of the ten Marines, seven accepted other than honorable discharges as part of a plea bargain, but three, including David Cox, refused to accept the plea bargain and went to court. Cox was defended by Don Marcari. Cox was found not guilty of aggravated battery but guilty of the misdemeanor charge of simple assault. He was sentenced to time already served in the brig and returned to active duty.

Cox was honorably discharged from the Marines in 1989. When he saw the film version of A Few Good Men, he was upset at the liberties taken with the event, most notably that the Marines in the case were dishonorably discharged, and considered suing the filmmakers. Cox disappeared in 1994. He was found murdered, along a riverbank near Medfield, Massachusetts.

References

External links

 

1989 plays
Broadway plays
Military courtroom dramas
Courtroom drama plays
Plays based on actual events
Plays by Aaron Sorkin
Works about the United States Marine Corps
American plays adapted into films
Courts-martial in fiction